Danjia Township is a rural township in Cangyuan Va Autonomous County, Yunnan, China.

Name
The word Danjia is transliteration in Wa language. Dan means river source and Jia means curse.

History
In 1968 Danjia was renamed Danjia Commune and then renamed Xiangyang Commune in the next year. It reverted to its former name of Danjia Commune in 1971. In 1984, Danjia District was established. It was upgraded to a township in 1988.

In April 2017, Anye Village was listed among the second batch of "Characteristic Villages of Ethnic Minorities in China" by the State Council of China.

Administrative division
As of 2017, the township is divided into 6 villages: Danjia Village, Pajie Village, Yonggai Village, Anye Village, Gaduo Village, and Yongwu Village.

Geography
Mountains located adjacent to and visible from the townsite are: Mount Dahei, Mount Andun, and Mount Bangpen.

The Lameng River  and Dongding River, both are tributaries of the Lancang River, flow through the town.

Dongding Reservoir is the largest body of water in the township.

Economy
The local economy is primarily based upon agriculture and local industry. Sugarcane, tea, tobacco, blueberry, cherry and myrica rubra are the main cash crops.

Education
The town has one middle school and nine primary schools.

References

Divisions of Cangyuan Va Autonomous County